Inline skates are a type of roller skate used for inline skating. Unlike quad skates, which have two front and two rear wheels, inline skates typically have two to five wheels arranged in a single line. Some, especially those for recreation, have a rubber "stop" or "brake" block attached to the rear of one or occasionally both of the skates so that the skater can slow down or stop by leaning back on the foot with the brake skate.

During the late 1980s and early 1990s, Rollerblade, Inc., a company founded by Scott and Brennan Olson in Minneapolis, Minnesota, widely promoted inline skating through the registered trademark Rollerblade. This term has since become a generic trademark for inline skates.

History

John Joseph Merlin experimented with single- to many-rowed devices worn on feet in 1760. Inline skates, skates designed to work like ice skates during periods of warm weather, was patented by Robert John Tyers of London in 1823, his Rolito design featured brass wheels. Louis Legrange of France created an inline design in 1849. Legrange designed the skates for an opera where a character was to appear to be skating on ice. The skates were problematic and unsuccessful as the wearer could not turn nor could they stop.

At some point between 1895 and 1899 the UK engineering company D. Napier & Son made Ritter "road skates", which had two comparatively large wheels, front and back, on each skate.

The first U.S. patent for modern in-line skates, designed to behave like ice runners with individually sprung and cushioned wheels, was granted in July 1953 to Ernest Kahlert of Santa Ana, CA. In September of 1953 an advertisement by the "Rocket Skate Company" for two wheel inline skates appeared in Popular Science. They were briefly described in the April 1950 issue of Popular Mechanics and again in the April 1954 issue of Popular Science in the section called "New Ideas from the Inventors". In Canada in 1972, Mountain Dew attempted to sell Mettoy's product the "Skeeler", an inline skate that was developed for Russian hockey players and speed skaters. In 1978, the German branch of SKF presented the "Speedy"-System, but the product was cancelled less than one year from market, as the management did not want a consumer product in the portfolio of the company.

The first commercially available inline skate for this form of roller skating is in 1987 by Rollerblade. In 1996, Jason Lewis completed the first solo crossing of the United States on inline skates, part of Expedition 360, a successful attempt to circumnavigate the globe using only human power. En route he was hit by a car in Colorado, breaking both legs. After nine months he completed the journey from Fort Lauderdale to San Francisco. In 2012, Kacie Fischer became the first woman, and the fastest person, to inline skate across the United States; she skated from California to Florida in 47 days.

Parts

A skate is composed of a boot, worn on the foot. To the boot is attached a frame, which holds the wheels in place.  Bearings allow the wheels to rotate freely around an axle. Finally, the rubber brake typically attaches to the frame of the right boot.

There are different types of inline skates for different types of skating such as aggressive skating, speed skating, inline hockey and artistic inline skating. Those differ in the boots, frames and wheels that are used.

Boot
For most skating a high boot is used, which provides more ankle support and is easier to skate in, particularly for beginners. Speed skaters often use a carbon fiber boot which provides greater support with a lower cut allowing more ankle flexion.

For recreational skating a soft boot is used for greater comfort, but many other disciplines prefer a harder boot, either to protect the foot against impact or for better control of the skate. The boot may also contain shock absorbent padding for comfort.  Downhill skaters often use boots that are heat-molded to the shape of the foot, with a foam liner.

Most aggressive skates use a hard boot or a hard/soft boot for increased support.

Frame

Typical recreational skates use frames built out of high-grade polyurethane (plastic). Low-end department or toy store skate frames may be composed of other types of plastic. Speed skate frames are usually built out of carbon fiber or extruded aluminum (more expensive but more solid), magnesium, or even pressed aluminium, which is then folded into a frame (cheaper but less sturdy).

Carbon fiber frames are expensive but generally more flexible, making for a smoother ride at the expense of worse power transfer between the leg and the wheels. Recently, high-end carbon fiber frames with a monocoque construction have been introduced.

Bearings

Ball bearings allow the wheels to rotate freely and smoothly. Bearings are usually rated on the ABEC scale, a measure of the manufactured precision tolerance, ranging from 1 (worst) to 9 (best) in odd numbers. The ABEC standards were originally intended for high-speed machinery, not skating applications, and do not account for the quality of steel used, which is very important for how long bearings last. While higher rated bearings are generally better in overall quality, whether they automatically translate to more speed is questionable. Since at least 2007, Rollerblade brand amongst others have begun using their own rating system.  For instance, Rollerblade brand is currently using a SG1 to SG9 rating system, whereas TwinCam brand is using its own "ILQ" (inline qualified) rating system and Bones brand is using its own "Skate Rated" rating system.

A mistake that is often made in purchasing bearings is that spending more translates to more speed.  Generally, clean inline skate bearings contribute about 2% of the rolling resistance that the best urethane inline skate wheels produce, so there is very little opportunity in improving speed by spending more money on bearings. Newer bearings on the market have been offered that use ceramic ball bearings instead of steel, which are more expensive than traditional steel bearings but made of harder material.

Two bearings are used per wheel. The bearings slip into openings molded into each side of the wheel hub, and a flange molded into the wheel hub holds the bearings the correct distance apart. Additionally there is an axle spacer either machined into the axle or that slides over the axle (depending on the axle system used). Since the outer race of the bearing contacts the wheel spacer and the inner race of the bearing contacts the axle spacer, it is critical that the relationship between these two spacers is correct. If the wheel spacer is wider than the axle spacer the bearings will bind when the axle bolt (or bolts) are tightened.

Wheels

Wheel sizes vary depending on the skating style.
  for aggressive skating.
  for roller hockey skating.
  for artistic inline skating.
  for freestyle slalom skating and downhill skating.
  for urban skating.
  for general recreational skating.
  for downhill inline skating.
  for tri-skating, mushroom blading, and speed skating.
  tires for off-road skating, and downhill mountain blading with inflatable tires.

Wheels are nowadays almost universally made of polyurethane (a kind of durable plastic). Most other plastics and rubber either wear down too quickly or have too much rolling resistance. In general, the bigger the wheel, the faster the skate. A bigger wheel rolls over road imperfections smoothly thus the less bumpy the skating. On top of that, an inline skater trips far less on large wheels. However, large wheels take more energy to start rolling. Smaller wheels allow faster acceleration, maneuverability, and a lower center of gravity.

Wheel hardness is measured on the A scale (see Durometer) and usually ranges between 72A-93A (lower numbers are softer, higher numbers are harder). Harder wheels are not necessarily faster but tend to be more durable; soft wheels may have better grip and are generally less affected by road bumps. Harder wheels (which grant minimal elastic hysteresis energy absorption) maintain rolling speed far better while softer wheels (because they grip the surface) accelerate more straightforwardly when striding. In the 1990s, wheel rolling resistance (CRR – coefficient of rolling resistance) tended to be minimized with wheel hardness in the 78A durometer range, with rolling resistance dramatically increasing below 75A durometer and above 85A durometer. In the early 2000s, urethane compounds improved significantly, allowing skaters to use harder compounds to get better wheel life, and get the lowest rolling resistance in the 82A–84A durometer range.

Wheel profiles and thickness again vary by application. Elliptic profiles were thought to minimize friction for a faster ride; however, they were intended to mimic the knife-like properties of an ice blade. They helped define the inner, central and outer edges. Elliptic profiles made the wheel quite maneuverable when turning or otherwise crossing over. More rounded profiles provided lower rolling resistance due to the greater "belly" or tire that increased resilience (or "rebound"); and these wheels were perceived as having better grip and being more stable (less like an ice blade), but were heavier than elliptical-profiled wheels and were often used in downhill racing (such as the Hyper Downhill racing wheels) and in recreational skates. Another advantage of rounded profile wheels is longer wear life due to the increased urethane amount on the tire.  To increase stability at high speed, skates intended for downhill skating usually have five or six wheels, in contrast with recreational skates, which typically have four wheels.  This advantage of more wheels having less rolling resistance has been largely negated by the  diameter wheels with 4-wheel trucks. A flat profile allowed the wheel to be even far stabler than the rounded profile. This profile is almost exclusively used on aggressive skate wheels. On the flip-side, the squared-off shape caused cornering to be tremendously harder, seeing how edges are non-existent with a flat profile. In fact, a flat profile has only a center edge preventing the skater from leaning over.

The core's general design i.e. material, shape, and flexibility/sturdiness degree at the wheel's hub determine the wheel's properties as well. In a classical point of view, wheels on older skate models (during the 1980s and early 1990s) contained no core feature whatsoever. The core is a result of the gradual technological improvement inline skating underwent. Above all else, a wheel lacking a core is prone to deformation. This deformation is a hindrance to the skater's striding ability since in such a case it minimizes the skater's top speed. The core is inserted to hold the polyurethane firmly in place. Despite the setback, markets still distribute special wheels without a core. Core designs vary among open, full or semi-open. 'Spokes' are an element seen in wheels whose cores are open which generally increase overall wheel lightness. These are inserted into the hubs of wheels for inline speed skates, fitness skates, recreational skates, some slalom skates and artistic/figure inline skates. Apart from spokes, other open-cores can be hollowed out internally. The main disadvantage about an open core is that their design does not permit sturdiness hence they are highly likely to snap under too much pressure i.e. when jumping. Another trade-off with open cores is the lesser amount of polyurethane around it to compensate for the spoked or hollow shape meaning they last shorter. Full cores are entirely solid, akin to a pipe's cross-section. This core design is mostly favored amongst aggressive skaters whose leaps off higher levels strain the wheels when landing. Of course, these cores (alongside the extra polyurethane) tend to add weight on the wheel. Some even disfavor the full core design for its rigidity that feels uncomfortable. The question still stands on whether a full core improves power transfer. Semi-open cores are a hybrid between the two previously mentioned cores seen on wheels for urban skates, slalom skates and inline hockey skates. Minuscule holes are typically punctured into these solid cores to provide a semi-open design.

Heel brakes or toe stops

A hard rubber brake attached to the heel of the frame allows the skater to stop by lifting the toes of the skate, forcing the brake onto the ground. Learning how to use the heel brake is very important for beginners, as it is the easiest way to stop in emergencies and to control speed on downhills. Also, with practice, beginners realise if the heel brakes are better placed for them on the left/right foot.

Heel brakes can interfere with a useful technique called a crossover turn, in which a skater crosses one leg over another to make a sharp turn without losing much speed; for this reason, most intermediate to advanced users prefer not to use heel brakes. Skaters in the freestyle slalom and aggressive inline skating disciplines do not use heel brakes, since they limit the skater's ability to perform tricks effectively. Aggressive inline skates and racing skates generally have no heel brake, thereby permitting extra speed and control.

Inline skaters lacking a heel brake can use various other methods to stop, such as the T-stop in which the skater moves one skate perpendicular to the other, making a "T" shape to increase friction and reduce speed, or the more advanced maneuver of a hockey stop/snow plow stop, in which the skater quickly moves both skates perpendicular to the path of motion.

For artistic roller skating purposes, inline figure skates can also feature a "toe stop" which aids in performing figure skating jumps.

Setups

Flat setup
A flat setup is the most common setup used on inline skates. Almost all non-aggressive inline skates are sold with a flat wheel setup. Flat means that all the wheels touch the ground at the same time when resting on flat ground. Flat setups are not the most maneuverable but what they lack in maneuverability they make up for in speed. Flat setups tend to be the fastest setups, compared to setups such as the Hi-Lo or anti-rocker. The presence of two middle wheels matching the diametrical size of the rest increases contact points with any surface.  They also minimize the rate at which the skater's loading weight deforms the wheels. This minimizes the wheel's footprint thereby minimizing rolling resistance. Speed skaters and marathon skaters normally use flat setups. This setup also allows for a powerslide, an advanced braking method.

Aggressive skates are sometimes sold with flat setups, but with a small space in the middle for grinding. With aggressive skates, the flat setup obviously leads to better control on the ground when either accelerating on a push or decelerating on a drag because of increased traction. It also grants a faster speed, translating to faster grinds, more powerful pumps in a skate ramp and/or higher heights ('airs') off the edge of a vert ramp. Indeed, flat setups are quick save for the likelihood that they will be heavier and the two standard central wheels tend to 'bite' when grinding. Similar to skateboarding in certain respects, 'biting' is a common hindrance during grinding whereby friction between the wheel(s) and surface it comes into contact causes the wheel(s) then entire boot to suddenly reach a halt and the momentum throws the aggressive inline skater off the rail or ledge. Again, the aspect of wheel profile is key here. A harder wheel on a flat setup will slide and 'bite' less than a softer wheel. Likewise an elliptical profile (Undercover's Dustin Werbeski 'super bullet' wheels for example) possesses less surface area hence it will not bite as much either. Adjusting to a flat setup can even out shock when landing jumps. In doing so, an inline skater's hardware like wheels, bearings, axles and the frame itself are twice as much to be spared damage.

It is worth noting that having a flat setup is just one factor in a fast skate setup. A long frame, low resistance bearings, and good technique all contribute greatly to a skater's speed.

Full 'crescent/banana' rocker
Full rockers are used by skaters who favor maneuverability when skating on flat ground. Freestyle skaters, freestyle slalom skaters and artistic inline skaters tend to use this setup. Inline hockey players no less can customize their wheels to implement this setup (especially those who favor nimble change in direction over sheer speed during a match). This setup is called "crescent" or "banana" because it is curved, and mimics a curved ice blade profile. On flat ground this setup will only have 1–2 wheels touching the ground at any one time. This makes the skate much easier to pivot but lacks stability so it is harder to balance on. To attain balance when learning to skate a full rocker, it is recommended that pressure and weight are deposited on either the two middle wheels or the two wheels in the back. Avoid applying pressure on the two front wheels when taking strides since this is what will cause instability. In addition, a full rocker is slower than a flat setup in terms of top speed. Worst of all at high speeds, skates with a full rocker setup can experience a speed wobble, where they oscillate uncontrollably. The skater may lose control and crash to the ground.

Flat setups generally wear into a 'natural' rocker. This is because the front and back wheels seem to receive the vast majority of wear on inline skates.

Having a short frame in combination with a full rocker is optimum for achieving the highest maneuverability when skating.

Front rocker
Front rockers are often used by street skaters who want to combine the ability of a full rocker to handle imperfections in the ground with a flat setup's sheer speed. Having a smaller wheel at the front encourages the front wheel to guide the rest of the skate over ground imperfections, rather than digging in and tripping up the less experienced skater. Maintaining a flat profile at the back allows the skater to transfer power through the rear of the skate efficiently to maintain a good speed.

‘Hi-Lo’ setup
Some hockey skates inline speed skates include a Hi-Lo setup. Hi-Lo setups resemble a flat setup in that all 4 wheels touch the ground at the same time. Unlike a flat setup, however, different wheel sizes are used. The front two wheels will be smaller than the back two wheels. This is possible because of the location of the axles on the frame itself. Another example is a  wheel arrangement. This drastically changed the pace at which inline hockey players accelerated. Furthermore, by transferring weight forward, the skater could sprint explosively off the toe section and reduce instances of falling backwards. If the hockey skate is used recreationally outside the arena, the skater will find climbing slopes much easier than on a flat setup. Owing to the fact that inline hockey skate manufacturers design frames with varying axle hole placements or even raise the frame's back bolt to be higher than the front bolt nowadays, wheels of the same diameter (like ) can be used entirely.

Beyond inline hockey, the Hi-Lo setup was an experimental component seen on K2's VO2 100 X Pro where the manufacturers believed that the two smaller wheels ( each) in front would increase stability and rate of acceleration while the two bigger wheels ( each) in the back would maintain high speeds. Essentially this K2 skate model married both wheel size properties. A Hi-Lo configuration on an inline speed skate employs three large sized wheels and a smaller sized wheel between the first and third wheels beneath the ball part of the foot (see speed skates). An example is a  arrangement beginning front to back. This increases efficiency now that the foot pushes on a smaller wheel. The smaller wheel lowers deck height off the ground improving stability and keeps the frame length shorter improving maneuverability and comfort amongst speed skaters having a smaller foot size. This is desirable seeing how wheels on inline speed skates are enormous enough to occupy a lot of room in frames. Unfortunately, top speed for a Hi-Lo setup is far less than that for a flat setup where same sized large wheels are used.

'TriDi' Hi-Lo setup
Another variant of the setup in which there are three diameters of wheels. It is supposed to emphasize the same benefits as the HiLo system but with greater maneuverability due to the smaller front wheels. It allows one to pivot on the third wheel similar to the brand Wizard Skates. This system is also used by some hockey skaters as it pitches the foot slightly forward.

Aggressive Hi-Lo setup
A few aggressive skate frames (most notably Rollerblade's Switch Frame, Ground Control's Bullet Frame, Oysi Frame and Joe Atkinson Sola Frame) are designed so that there are two big outer wheels, and two small inner wheels, rockered so that they all touch the ground. This gives the benefits of a flat setup, while keeping the frame as low as the height of the smaller inner wheels. It also retains room for an H-block in the center. But out bigger outer wheels give some of the benefits bigger wheels offer such as speed and stability.

Anti-rocker
Anti-rocker is the most popular setup for aggressive skaters. An anti-rocker wheel is a small hard wheel that replaces the two middle wheels.  Anti-rocker wheels almost never touch the ground except in cases where the terrain is uneven, such as skating over a ramp. Anti-rockers can be made of plastic, or high density polyurethane. Some use bearings so that they can spin. As they can spin, the anti-rockers wear out more evenly when grinding. Anti-rockers containing bearings can effectively roll over uneven ground or features like steps, lessening tripping hazards. Others do not use bearings so that they're lighter. The anti-rockers themselves lock the H-block onto the ledge or rail a skater grinds. There is a minor nuisance to anti-rocker hardware in which the items emit a loud noise upon fastening into a grind that some aggressive skaters find unbearable. The anti-rocker setup altogether makes maneuvering harder (since the standard wheels slip more), wheel life shorter, overall speed slower, a rougher ride, and a wider turning radius, but because of the extra space in the middle, it makes grinding objects much easier than with a flat setup.

Freestyle
The freestyle frame is another setup used by aggressive skaters. This setup simply has only two wheels – one in the front and one in the back. In between the two wheels is an area of solid material, resembling a large "H Block", which is used for grinding. Freestyle frames have nearly identical advantages to the Anti-rocker. Since large space is freed up in the middle, the skater can not only grind wider surface areas like an entire ledge but also the frame's weight is lighter. Likewise, the Freestyle frame shares its disadvantages with its Anti-rocker cousin already listed. As opposed to anti-rockers which securely lock grinds, aggressive skaters should train themselves to remain balanced when sliding across narrow rails or edges on a Freestyle frame. Worse still when not observing carefulness, a Freestyle setup can easily hook on vertical surfaces including steps, coping and funbox edges if you roll over them, leading to tripping incidents. This is why the technique to 'bash' (see Flat Setup) a staircase is almost impossible on a Freestyle setup. Freestyle frames can be purchased, although removing the two inner wheels of a flat or anti-rocker frame technically makes it freestyle, however this would not be very durable due to the lack of solid grinding material. Originally invented by Fifty-50 (an aggressive inline skate frame company), Juice Blocks allow the skater to convert their flat or anti-rocker frames into proper freestyle frames. Juice Blocks are simply solid grind blocks inserted into the axle holes where two middle wheels or anti-rockers are found.

Tri-rocker
Tri-rocker (not to be confused with the 3-wheeled frame/chassis seen on Tri-Skates) is used by some aggressive skaters. It is another method of making grinds easier. A frame with a tri-rocker setup has only one wheel in the middle, either in the second wheel position or in the third wheel position, depending on what kinds of grinds the skater plans on doing. The remaining axle has an anti-rocker wheel, a special grind block, or is just left empty.

The purpose of a tri-rocker setup is to give the skater good speed and maneuverability, like on a flat setup. But because of the extra space, grinding is also a little easier than a flat setup.

Gallery

See also
Forms of inline skating:

 Aggressive inline skating
 Artistic roller skating
 Freestyle slalom skating
Ice skates
 Inline figure skating
 Inline hockey
 Inline speed skating
 Recreational skating
Roller shoe
 Road skating
 Roller skates
 Vert skating

References

External links

 The Londonskaters guide to rockering inline skates
 Markus Thierstein's original article
 The National Museum of Roller Skating

Roller skates
Roller skating equipment
1980s fads and trends
1990s fads and trends